(meaning son) is a Malay and Indonesian name. It derives from the word son in Sanskrit

Notable people with the name include:

Aleksandra Putra (born 1986), Polish competitive swimmer
Aditya Putra Dewa (born 1990), Indonesian footballer
Agripina Prima Rahmanto Putra (born 1991), Indonesian badminton player
Ahmad Maulana Putra (born 1988), Indonesian footballer
Aji Bayu Putra (born 1993), Indonesian footballer
Andika Eka Putra (died 2016), Indonesian Islamic militant
Andre Putra Wibowo (born 1996), Indonesian footballer
Angga Febryanto Putra (born 1995), Indonesian footballer
Arifin Putra (born 1987), German-Indonesian actor
Arifki Eka Putra (born 1987), Indonesian footballer
Asraruddin Putra Omar (born 1988), Malaysian footballer
Baskara Putra, member of Indonesian band .Feast
Beckham Putra (born 2001), Indonesian footballer
Budi Putra (born 1972), a Jakarta, Indonesia-based journalist
Caisar Putra Aditya (born 1989), Indonesian comedian, dancer, and actor
Dias Angga Putra (born 1989), Indonesian footballer
Feby Eka Putra (born 1999), Indonesian footballer
Eddy Santana Putra (born 1957), Indonesian politician who served as the mayor of Palembang
Eko Pradana Putra, Singaporean footballer
Geraldine Johns-Putra (born 1982), Malaysian and Australian chess player
Hanis Sagara Putra (born 1999), Indonesian footballer
Hutomo Mandala Putra (born 1962), commonly known as Tommy Suharto, Indonesian businessman, politician, and convicted murderer
I Komang Putra, Indonesian footballer
Indra Putra Mahayuddin (born 1981), Malaysian footballer
Iner Sontany Putra (born 1995), Indonesian footballer
Jandia Eka Putra (born 1987), Indonesian footballer
Jonathan Putra (born 1982), British television host and actor
Krzysztof Putra (1957–2010), Polish politician
Oki Dwi Putra (born 1983), Indonesian football referee
Pawira Putra (born 1989), Indonesian footballer 
Putra Erwiansyah (born 2004), Indonesian badminton player
Putra Nababan, (born 1974) Indonesian journalist
Risqki Putra Utomo (born 1998), Indonesian footballer
Rommy Diaz Putra (born 1980), Indonesian footballer
Rudi Putra, Indonesian biologist
Setyaldi Putra Wibowo (born 1994), Indonesian male badminton player
Sisworo Gautama Putra (1938–1993), Indonesian film director and screenwriter
Tengku Putra (born 1951), Malaysian corporate figure and a member of the Selangor Royal Family and Kelantan Royal Family
Tjokorda Krishna Putra Sudharsana (born 1956), Balinese artist and the current prince of Ubud
Tommy Rifka Putra (born 1984), Indonesian footballer
Tuanku Syed Putra (1920-2000), the 6th Raja of Perlis (1945-2000) and the 3rd Yang di-Pertuan Agong of Malaya and later Malaysia (1960-1965)
Tuanku Syed Faizuddin Putra Jamalullail (born 1967), Raja Muda (Crown Prince) of the Malaysian state of Perlis
Tunku Abdul Rahman Putra, the first Prime Minister of Malaysia, whose name was used for the new city of Putrajaya
Windu Hanggono Putra (born 1988), Indonesian footballer

Indonesian-language surnames